is a railway station on the Tobu Utsunomiya Line in Mibu, Tochigi, Japan, operated by the private railway operator Tobu Railway. The station is numbered "TN-33".

Lines

Station layout
The station consists of one island platforms connected to the station building by an underground passageway.

Platforms

Adjacent stations

History
Mibu Station opened on 11 August 1931. From 17 March 2012, station numbering was introduced on all Tobu lines, with Mibu Station becoming "TN-3d".

Surrounding area
Mibu Town Hall
Site of former Mibu Castle
Mibu Central Post Office

See also
 List of railway stations in Japan

References

External links

  

Railway stations in Tochigi Prefecture
Stations of Tobu Railway
Railway stations in Japan opened in 1931
Tobu Utsunomiya Line
Mibu, Tochigi